Events from the year 1983 in South Korea.

Incumbents
President: Chun Doo-hwan
Prime Minister: Kim Sang-hyup (until 14 October), Chin Iee-chong (starting 14 October)

Events

1 September - The Korean Air Flight 007 was shot down by a Soviet SU-15 Interceptor.

Births

 January 1 - Park Sung-hyun, archer
 April 18 - Jang Nam-seok, footballer
 April 30 - Yun Mi-jin, archer
 May 24 - Woo Seung-yeon, model and actress
 July 15 - Han Seol, football player
 October 8 - Lee Sang-hee (actress), actress

See also
List of South Korean films of 1983 
Years in Japan
Years in North Korea

References

 
South Korea
Years of the 20th century in South Korea
1980s in South Korea
South Korea